Nobber GFC is a Gaelic Athletic Association club based in Nobber, County Meath, Ireland. The club competes in Meath GAA competitions. The club has won the Meath Senior Football Championship once when North Meath GAA (which consisted of a few clubs in North Meath including Nobber) won the title in 1950. In 1983, 1986, and 1989 Nobber reached the semi-final of the Senior championship. The club currently competes at Senior level, after winning the Intermediate Championship in 2019, The Club also won the Intermediate Championship in 1980 and also in 2010.

Previous Seasons

2001 Season
 Nobber reached the semi-final of the Meath Junior Football Championship after beating Dunsany in the quarter-final but lost to Curraha 1-10 to 0-11 in a semi-final replay.

2002 Season
 Nobber won the Meath Junior Football Championship with a 1-15 to 2-7 scoreline over Dunsany. Nobber then went on to win the Leinster Junior Football Championship against Kildare side Moorfield, and then went on to win the All-Ireland in 2003.

2003 Season
 Nobber failed to qualify for the Meath Intermediate quarter-finals in 2003.
 In the All-Ireland Junior Football Championship Nobber defeated Monaghan side Corduff in the semi-final and then went on to beat Kilmeena from Mayo 2-13 to 1-13.
 Nobber won the Meath All County 'A' Football League Division 4 with a win over Longwood.

2004 Season
 Nobber lost to Wolfe Tones in the semi-final of the Intermediate championship.

2005 Season
 Nobber lost out to neighbours Siddan in the semi-final of the Intermediate championship.

2006 Season
 Nobber bowed out of the Meath Intermediate Football Championship at the quarter-final stage to Castletown 0-13 to 0-10.

2007 Season
 Nobber reached the semi-final of the Intermediate Championship losing to eventual winners Donaghmore Ashbourne 2-10 to 1-8.
 Nobber performed poorly in the Meath All County 'A' Football League Division 3 winning only 4 of their 10 matches.

2008 Season
 2008 was a disappointing year for Nobber as they failed to reach the knock-out stages of the Intermediate Championship by losing to St Michaels and Cortown.

2009 Season
 Nobber reached the semi-final of the Meath Intermediate Football Championship and narrowly lost to Kilmainhamwood after a replay 0-15 to 1-15.
 Nobber finished 6th in the Meath All County 'A' Football League Division 3.

2010 Season
 Nobber won the Intermediate championship in Pairc Tailteann, Navan, by defeating Carnaross in the final 1-12 to 0-7. In the quarter-final of the Leinster Intermediate Club Football Championship, Nobber travelled to Bunbrosna of Westmeath and narrowly edged a 2-10 to 1-11 victory. In the semi-final, Nobber defeated Carlow side Naomh Eoin by 0-11 to 1-7 in Dr. Cullen Park. On Sunday 16 January, Nobber faced Kildare side Ballymore Eustace in Ballymore Eustace in the Leinster final. Ballymore lead 0-9 to 0-4 at half time, but Nobber roared back, scoring many scores without reply but the Kildare outfit held out to win 0-12 to 0-10.
 Nobber also won the Meath All County 'A' Football League Division 3 after extra time in Kells against Ballinlough.
 Nober were beaten in the first round of the 2010 Feis Cup against Walterstown
 Nobber also competed in the Season 3 of the RTÉ television programme Celebrity Bainisteoir. Nobber's bainisteoir was television presenter Bláthnaid Ní Chofaigh. Nobber hosted St Molaise GAA from Irvinestown, Co. Fermanagh in their quarter-final on 11 August 2010. Nobber won the match and progressed to the semi-final of the event. On 10 October 2010, Nobber played Ballymun Kickhams in Ballymun, Co. Dublin, but lost with a final score of 2-9 to 2-4.
 Nobber's second team reached the Meath Junior C Football Championship final losing to Donaghmore/Ashbourne's third team. They also won the Meath All County 'B' Football League Division 3 final against Trim in Bohermeen.

2011 Season
 In the Senior Championship Nobber avoided relegation in the relegation playoff with a two-point win over Trim, which guaranteed a spot in the 2012 Senior Championship.
In the 2011 Feis Cup Nobber lost in the 2nd Round to St Patricks.
Nobber won the All-Ireland Intermediate Football Sevens in Ratoath. They beat Ratoath, County Meath in the semi-final and beat Tír na nÓg of Randalstown, County Antrim by 1-12 to 1-6 in the final after extra time.
Nobber finished ninth out of twelve in their first year in the Meath All County 'A' Football League Division 2, winning only four of their eleven matches.

2012 Season
 In the Senior Championship Nobber had a poor campaign finishing bottom of their group, losing 4 and drawing 1 match.
 The 2nd team won the Meath Junior 'C' Football Championship in Pairc Tailteann 1-9 to 0-7 against Syddan. 
 Nobber finished 3rd in the Meath All County 'A' League Division 2, just missing out on promotion with 8 wins, 1 draw and 2 losses.
 Nobber lost in the first round of the 2012 Feis Cup after a replay to Duleek/Bellewstown.
 Nobber made it through the group stage to the last 16 of the All-Ireland Intermediate Football Sevens in Ratoath, losing to Tyrellspass, Westmeath. However, they drew with eventual winners Moy, Tyrone in the group stage and also had wins over Ballyhaunis, Mayo and Naomh Columba of Donegal.
 Nobber won the Thomas Coogan Cup defeating Donaghmore/Ashbourne in the final and Oldcastle in the semi-final.

Notable players
 Brian Farrell
Gerry Mc Entee

Honours
Meath Senior Football Championship: 1
 1950 (North Meath GAA)
All-Ireland Intermediate Football Sevens: 1
 2011
Leinster Intermediate Club Football Championship Finalists:1
 2010
Meath Intermediate Football Championship: 3
 1980, 2010, 2019
All-Ireland Junior Club Football Championship:1
 2003
Leinster Junior Club Football Championship:1
 2002
Meath Junior Football Championship:2
 1946, 2002
Meath Junior 'B' Football Championship:1
 1988 (2nd Team)
Meath Junior 'C' Football Championship:1
 2012 (2nd Team)
Feis Cup:1
 1983
Meath All County 'A' League Division 3:1
 2010
Meath All County 'A' League Division 4:1
 2002
Meath All County 'B' League Division 3:1
 2010 (2nd Team)
Thomas Coogan Cup:1
 2012
Corn na Boinne Cup winners 2014 and 2015

Gaelic games clubs in County Meath